Teatro Rossini is the name of an opera house in Lugo, Italy that serves as an adjunct venue for the work of Teatro Comunale di Bologna.

The Teatro Rossini was built in 1760, its main parts following a design of Ambrogio Petrocchi. Work on its interior, including the stage, seating, and balconies, was completed by Antonio Galli Bibiena. The theater's work has embraced collaborations with Ravenna's Teatro Alighieri and Pesaro's Rossini Foundation, as well as the ties to Bologna. It seats roughly 500.

The theatre took its present name in honour of the composer Gioachino Rossini in 1859.

See also
List of opera festivals
List of opera houses

References
 Plantamura, Carol, The Opera Lover's Guide to Europe, New York: Citadel Press, 1996  
Zeitz, Karyl Lynn, Italian Opera Houses and Festivals, Lanham, Maryland: The Scarecrow Press, Inc., 2005

External links
  Teatro Rossini at Lugo, Italy

Opera houses in Italy
Buildings and structures in the Province of Ravenna
Theatres completed in 1760
Theatres in Italy
Music venues completed in 1760
18th-century architecture in Italy